New Cruse 92.7 FM is a privately owned Nigerian radio station located in located in Ikere Ekiti, Ekiti State.

The station is owned by Chief Wole Olanipekun (SAN), former president of the Nigerian Bar Association (NBA). Broadcasts began in March 2020, with full programming on April 14 of that year.

References 

Radio stations in Nigeria
2020 establishments in Nigeria
Radio stations established in 2020